The 2014 Irish local elections were held in all local government areas of the Republic of Ireland on Friday, 23 May 2014, on the same day as the European Parliament election and two by-elections (Dublin West and Longford–Westmeath). The poll in the Ballybay–Clones LEA on Monaghan County Council was deferred due to the death of a candidate.

Overview
These elections took place after the coming into force of the Local Government Reform Act 2014, under which city and county councils were contested under substantially redrawn local electoral area (LEA) boundaries, including an overall increase of seats to 949, up from 883 in the 2009 local elections. It also saw the abolition of borough and town councils. New municipal districts were created within most counties. Generally, a municipal district contains one LEA, though a few districts around larger urban areas contain multiple LEAs.

The elections took place a little over three years after the last general election, which led to a government of Fine Gael and the Labour Party. The elections were a major setback for Fine Gael and Labour. Fine Gael lost control of many councils, falling behind Fianna Fáil on some. Labour lost more than half of its local authority seats. Fianna Fáil showed a recovery, again becoming the largest party at local level with an increased share of the vote. The party also took control of some councils, while on others it formed alliances with Fine Gael. Sinn Féin was the main winner in this election, becoming the third-largest party at local level. There were also major gains for independents and smaller parties. As a result of its disastrous performance, the Labour leader Eamon Gilmore resigned.

Opinion polls

Poll results are listed in the table below in reverse chronological order, showing the most recent first. Only polls conducted in the period leading up to the election and immediately afterwards are shown.

Results

Results from the Anti-Austerity Alliance are compared to the Socialist Party in the 2009 local elections. Republican Sinn Féin are not a registered party; therefore, their candidates appear on the ballot as Non-Party.

Detailed results by council

Largest parties by council

Footnotes

References

Sources

Citations

External links
 Irish local elections, 2014 at Electionsireland.org

 
Local elections
Local elections
2014
Local elections